Irma Resendez (born August 3, 1961) is an American advocate and author who founded the bilingual multiple sclerosis non-profit organization Familia Unida Living with MS in 1998.  In 2005, Resendez served as a commissioner on disabilities for the city of Los Angeles. In 2014, Resendez wrote Simply Amor: A Mother's Miracle Living with MS, a collection of her personal experiences.

Early life
Resendez was born on August 3, 1961, in Boyle Heights, California at White Memorial Medical Center. She is the daughter of Juanita Lopez. Lopez raised Irma and her two sisters in Lincoln Heights, Los Angeles.

Career as an activist
In 1998, Resendez founded Familia Unida Living with MS. In 2005 Resendez was appointed as commissioner on disabilities for the city of Los Angeles. Resendez created the concept of the Wheelchair Wash Health Access Fair, an annual disability community event held in Los Angeles.

References

External links
 First District’s “Woman of the Year”  http://gloriamolina.org/2008/04/22/grand-avenue-park-public-outreach-meeting/
  "Helping people with disabilities" - Abc 7- http://abc13.com/archive/6102521/
 Healthcare Reform Is Needed: One In Three Hispanic Women Have No Health Benefits - http://www.usaonrace.com/race-politics/742/healthcare-reform-is-needed-one-in-three-hispanic-women-have-no-health-benefits#sthash.hdeKf0kc.dpuf

American memoirists
1961 births
Living people
People from Boyle Heights, Los Angeles
People from Lincoln Heights, Los Angeles